The zipper sandskate (Psammobatis extenta) is a species of fish in the family Arhynchobatidae. It is found in the Atlantic Ocean off the coasts of Argentina, Brazil, and Uruguay. Its natural habitat is open seas.

References

Psammobatis
Taxonomy articles created by Polbot
Fish described in 1913